Allen Hall Seminary, often abbreviated to Allen Hall, is the Roman Catholic seminary and theological college of the Province of Westminster at 28 Beaufort Street in Chelsea, London, in the London Borough of Kensington and Chelsea. It is situated on the site of the house that was once occupied by St Thomas More. Though nothing of the house remains, parts of the 16th-century garden wall exist today.

History

The Catholic theological college is named after Cardinal William Allen who founded a seminary in Douai, France, in 1568 to provide for the English mission in time of persecution when it was illegal to train men for the Catholic priesthood in England.

In 1793, the professors and students moved from Douai to Ware, Hertfordshire, to escape the French revolution and founded St Edmund's College.

The site of the seminary dates back to 1524, when it was purchased by Henry VIII's chancellor, Thomas More. Although his house no longer exists, one of the mulberry trees he planted survives in the seminary garden, which is one of the largest gardens in Chelsea.

The current building is a former convent built by French nuns in the 19th and 20th centuries, the Sisters of the Adoration Réparatrice, who occupied it until 1975 when it was bought by the Archdiocese of Westminster. The college chapel was designed by Hector Corfiato and was completed in 1958.

In 1975 the seminary itself moved its present-day site which allowed St Edmund's to expand as a school and became Allen Hall.

Educational programmes
The seminary comes under the authority of the Archbishop of Westminster and although it serves as a seminary for the dioceses within the Province of Westminster, it welcomes seminarians from other dioceses of England and Wales and from abroad.

Those training for the priesthood are typically in formation for six years. The first two years are spent studying philosophy, and the third year is currently spent in a parish, which provides an important pastoral experience, before the remaining three years of study which focus on theology.

Since 2019, studies are completed through the Mater Ecclesiae College, a Pontifical Institute based at Allen Hall, which is in partnership with St Mary’s University, Twickenham. All Mater Ecclesiae students who complete their degrees may receive both the civil degree, a BA (Hons) in Theological Studies from St Mary’s, as well as the Ecclesiastical degree, the Baccalaureate in Sacred Theology (STB) from Mater Ecclesiae, which has the faculties to award pontifical qualifications under the auspices of the Congregation for Catholic Education in Rome.

As well as teaching the philosophy and theology subjects prescribed by the Catholic Church, every student is also required to gain pastoral experiences in parishes, schools and hospitals and, if appropriate, in a more specialised placement such as a hospice or prison. The staff there help the students reflect on their pastoral experiences both individually and with others.

See also

 Redemptoris Mater House of Formation

References

External links
 

Catholic seminaries in England
Chelsea, London
Education in the Royal Borough of Kensington and Chelsea
History of the Royal Borough of Kensington and Chelsea
Grade II listed buildings in the Royal Borough of Kensington and Chelsea